Ne parliamo Lunedì is a 1990 Italian dark/erotic comedy film directed by Luciano Odorisio. For this film Elena Sofia Ricci was awarded with a  David di Donatello for Best Actress and with a Ciak d'oro in the same category.

Cast 
Andrea Roncato - Marcello
Elena Sofia Ricci - Alma
Francesco Scali - Giogiò
Sebastiano Nardone - Nico

References

External links

1990 films
Italian black comedy films
1990s black comedy films
Films directed by Luciano Odorisio
Films scored by Luigi Ceccarelli
1990 comedy films
1990s Italian films